Seioptera importans is a species of ulidiid or picture-winged fly in the genus Seioptera of the family Ulidiidae.

References

importans